Sunbury railway station serves the town of Sunbury-on-Thames, in the Spelthorne district of Surrey, England. The station and all trains serving it are operated by South Western Railway.

History
The Shepperton branch opened to passengers with a single track on 1 November 1864. Its promoters' scheme first intended to link this to what became today's District line and potentially to Woking railway station. A second scheme (abandoned 1862) intended it to extend to the Middlesex bank of the Thames east of Chertsey Bridge to serve the established town of Chertsey. The curve linking Fulwell and Teddington initially opened to freight on 1 July 1894 and then carried passengers on 1 June 1901 as the replacement principal route.  The line was electrified on 30 January 1916.

Services 

The typical weekday hourly service at the station is:

2 trains to London Waterloo via Kingston and Clapham Junction
2 trains from London Waterloo by that route.

Monday to Friday, four additional early morning rush-hour trains to Waterloo are routed via Twickenham and Richmond. Three additional evening rush-hour trains from Waterloo arrive via that route.

The Saturday service is as on other weekdays without the extra services routed via Twickenham. On Sundays the service is hourly.

Connections 
London bus routes 216 and 235, and local bus routes 555 and 557, all serve the station.

Notes and references
References

External links

Railway stations in Surrey
Former London and South Western Railway stations
Railway stations in Great Britain opened in 1864
Railway stations served by South Western Railway
Sunbury-on-Thames